Dan Neal (born August 30, 1949) is a former American Football player who played offensive line for eleven seasons between 1973 and 1983 for the Baltimore Colts and the Chicago Bears. He was named offensive line coach in 2007 for Texas vs. The Nation Game, winning a 24–20 victory in Sun Bowl Stadium.

Neal spent 11 years as a player, 15 years as a coach, totaling 26 total years in the NFL. He served as team captain his Junior and Senior years at the University of Kentucky. He was drafted in the 11th round by the Colts in 1973, remaining for 2 seasons. He played for the Chicago Bears from 1975 to 1983 blocking for Walter Payton, and as a Kick snapper.

After breaking his back he began his coaching career with the Philadelphia Eagles where he coached special teams in 1986-'87 and offensive line '88-91. He then followed Buddy Ryan to the Arizona Cardinals and was the offensive line coach for 1994–95. He coached under Mike Ditka as the tight end coach for the New Orleans Saints 1997–99. (He was the only person to play and coach for Ditka). He moved to the Tennessee Titans as their offensive assistant in 2000. He ended his coaching career as tight end coach for the Buffalo Bills 2001-'03.

Neal was born August 30, 1949, in Corbin, Ky. He and his wife Barbara have 2 daughters Kelly and Tiffany.

Dan has been inducted into Kentucky Athletic Hall of Fame, Kentucky Pro Football Hall of Fame and the Atherton High School Hall of Fame.

After retiring from football Dan owned and operated Coach's Fitness Club that had locations in Louisville and Prospect Kentucky.

References

1949 births
Living people
People from Corbin, Kentucky
Players of American football from Kentucky
American football centers
American football offensive guards
Kentucky Wildcats football players
Baltimore Colts players
Chicago Bears players